Tordis is a given name. Notable people with the name include:

Tordis Gjems Selmer (1886–1964), Norwegian singer
Tordis Maurstad (1901–1997), Norwegian stage actress
Tordis Ørjasæter (born 1927), Norwegian literary critic, biographer, former professor of educational science, and novelist